Doncaster Racecourse (also known as the Town Moor course) is a racecourse in Doncaster, South Yorkshire, England. It hosts two of Great Britain's 36 annual Group 1 flat races, the St Leger Stakes and the Racing Post Trophy.

History 
Doncaster is one of the oldest (and the largest in physical capacity) established centres for horse racing in Britain, with records of regular race meetings going back to the 16th century. A map of 1595 already shows a racecourse at Town Moor. In 1600 the corporation tried to put an end to the races because of the number of ruffians they attracted, but by 1614 it acknowledged failure and instead marked out a racecourse.

Doncaster is home to two of the World's oldest horse races:

The Doncaster Cup

The earliest important race in Doncaster's history was the Doncaster Gold Cup, first run over Cantley Common in 1766. The Doncaster Cup is the oldest continuing regulated horse race in the world. Together with the  Goodwood Cup and  Ascot Gold Cup, the Doncaster Cup is part of Britain's Stayers' Triple Crown for horses capable of running longer distances.

The St. Leger Stakes

Ten years later the racecourse moved to its present location, and in 1776 Colonel Anthony St. Leger founded a race in which five horses ran. This race has remained in existence and has become the world's oldest classic horse race. During the First World War the racecourse was used for military purposes, and substitute races were run at Newmarket from 1915 to 1918.

Doncaster has the distinction of both starting and ending the flat season on turf. Every September, Doncaster hosts the prestigious four-day William Hill St. Leger Festival, which is acclaimed as the premier sporting occasion of the autumn calendar. Doncaster has also taken over events whose traditional homes have closed, such as the Lincoln Handicap in 1965. More history was made at Doncaster in 1992 when it staged the first ever Sunday meeting on a British racecourse. A crowd of 23,000 turned up despite the absence of betting.

The racecourse is used for other functions. It regularly hosts conventions such as the Tattoo Festival and business meetings such as Doncaster Dynamites BNI every Wednesday. The current membership committee of that BNI chapter comprises local Doncaster business people Michael Reeder, Ailsa Watson, James Criddle, Mark Appleyard, Jason Cole, Ian Smith and Andrew Isaacs.

Today the St. Leger Stakes remains the world's oldest classic horse race, and features in the horse racing calendar as the fifth and final Classic of the British Flat racing season. It is run every September.

Specifications

Doncaster is a left-handed, pear-shaped track of around 1 mile 7½ furlongs (3.1 km) which is mostly flat. There are courses for Flat racing and National Hunt racing. The racecourse is easily accessible by road, railway and air.

Notable races

Other races
 2-Y-O Stakes
 Doncaster Stakes
 Gillies Fillies' Stakes
 Wentworth Stakes
 William Hill Handicap Chase

See also
Listed buildings in Doncaster (Wheatley Hills and Intake Ward)

References

Bibliography

External links 

 
 Racecourse Guide a GGTV.co.uk
 Course guide on GG.COM
 Course guide on At The Races
 Local racing portal

 
Sports venues in Doncaster
Horse racing venues in England